Boyces Bridge railway station was a station in Norfolk on the Wisbech and Upwell Tramway commonly known as the Upwell Tramway. It was located north of Outwell. It was opened in 1883 along with the rest of the line, and closed to passengers in 1928 and goods in 1966.

References

Disused railway stations in Norfolk
Former Wisbech and Upwell Tramway stations
Railway stations in Great Britain opened in 1883
Railway stations in Great Britain closed in 1928